Hard Sun is a pre-apocalyptic British crime drama series, created and written by Neil Cross, starring Agyness Deyn and Jim Sturgess as the principal characters, DI Elaine Renko and DCI Charlie Hicks. The series is a BBC co-production with the American streaming service Hulu.

The first series contains six episodes. It premiered on BBC One on 6 January 2018, with all six episodes subsequently available on the same day via BBC iPlayer. The series premiered on Hulu in the United States on 7 March 2018. The series has also been acquired by the Seven Network in Australia, ZDF in Germany and SVT in Sweden. The first series was released on DVD and Blu-ray on 19 February 2018.

Writer Neil Cross has since expressed his wish to continue the series beyond its first run, claiming he has sketched out a potential five-year story arc. It was cancelled after one season.

Premise
Hard Sun is a pre-apocalyptic crime drama set in contemporary London. The protagonists are two mismatched police officers, Charlie Hicks and Elaine Renko, who stumble upon proof that a mysterious cosmic event will destroy the earth in five years, a fact the government is trying to keep secret to avoid complete anarchy. The duo is pursued by MI5 operatives who are trying to silence them for good.

Cast and characters
 Jim Sturgess as Detective Chief Inspector Charlie Hicks
 Agyness Deyn as Detective Inspector Elaine Renko
 Nikki Amuka-Bird as Grace Morrigan
 Owain Arthur as Detective Sergeant Keith Greener
 Lorraine Burroughs as Simone Hicks
 Richard Coyle as Thom Blackwood
 Dermot Crowley as Father Dennis Chapman
 Varada Sethu as Detective Sergeant Mishal Ali
 Jojo Macari as Daniel Renko
 Adrian Rawlins as Detective Sergeant George Mooney
 Derek Riddell as Detective Chief Superintendent Roland Bell
 Ukweli Roach as Will Benedetti
 Joplin Sibtain as Detective Sergeant Herbie Sarafian
 Aisling Bea as Mari Butler

Reception

Critical reception
Reviews for the first season were mixed.  On the review aggregation website Rotten Tomatoes, the first season holds a 50% approval rating with an average rating of 6.46 out of 10, based on 30 reviews. The website's critical consensus reads, "Hard Sun's heady mix of narrative and visual flourishes buckle under a surfeit of clichés that ultimately weigh it down and leave the show a muddled mess." Metacritic, which uses a weighted average, assigned the season a score of 46 out of 100 based on 9 critics, indicating "mixed or average reviews".

Episodes

References

External links
 
 

2018 British television series debuts
2018 British television series endings
2010s British crime drama television series
2010s British science fiction television series
2010s British television miniseries
Apocalyptic television series
BBC high definition shows
BBC television dramas
English-language television shows
Hulu original programming
Television series by Euston Films
Television series by Fremantle (company)
Television shows set in London
Works by Neil Cross